Albert Bensimon (born 1948) is an Egyptian-Australian businessman from Adelaide, South Australia. He is most well known as the owner of Shiels Jewellers. He frequently appeared in television advertisements and became famous for his catchphrase "No Hoo-Haa".

Bensimon was born in Cairo, Egypt. His secondary education took place at the Christian Brothers College in Rose Bay, New South Wales followed by a stint at the London School of Economics. Bensimon is of Jewish and French descent.

In 1994, he helped to establish the Helpmann Academy, named in honour of famous South Australian Sir Robert Helpmann. The academy is designed to promote the arts in South Australia. He was the first chairman and is still a member of its board.

At the 2002 South Australian state election, Bensimon ran as a "No Hoo-Haa Party" candidate in the House of Assembly seat of Adelaide, receiving a primary vote of 2.4 percent (492 votes). His "how-to-vote" ticket indicated a first preference for the Liberal Party of Australia. Bensimon is also a donor to the Liberal Party.

In 2006, Bensimon was rejected twice for membership of the gentlemen's club, The Adelaide Club, which he claimed was due to anti-Semitism. This was denied by the Club president, who stated that it was "offensive" to suggest the club was racist and that it has "a diverse membership". In 2008, when another Egyptian-born Jewish businessman was accepted for membership, Bensimon claimed some credit for the move, saying "I broke the back of a small but influential element within the Adelaide Club."

Early life 
In 1969, Albert married and he and his wife Nyra took off on a working holiday to Europe. They travelled on a motorbike for a year and then they decided to come home via Canada. They intended to work for a month in Canada but ended up living there seven years. In 1977, after extensive work experience in marketing studies, the Bensimon's decided to return home to Australia. And after many years in marketing, Albert decided to turn his hobby for marketing jewellery into a career and decided to open up a jewellery store.

Albert would then go on to purchase Shiels Jewellers, a local jewellery store in the city from the recently widowed wife of Jack Shiels. When Albert took over Shiels, the business had a turnover of around $100,000 per year. Using his knowledge of marketing and sales from his experience selling pharmaceuticals and computer software, Albert decided to expand Shiels' product range to include more precious jewellery such as gold, silver and diamonds. The gift lines were dropped with the aim to establish a reputation for quality, value and range in the jewellery sector; especially in diamonds.

Shiels Jewellers 
Shiels Jewellers (known colloquially as Shiels) is an Australian jewellery retailer headquartered in Adelaide, South Australia. It sells bridal and diamond jewellery in a variety of metals, leather items, gemstone jewellery and watches for women, men and children. Shiels Jewellers is renowned for its quality, affordable diamond range and markets itself as the home of the 1 carat diamond.

Founded in 1945 by South Australian jeweller Jack Shiels, the business initially had a single store which operated out of Adelaide's Central Market Arcade selling jewellery, giftware and silver-plated merchandise.

Since Albert took over the business in 1977, Shiels Jewellers has grown tremendously. Employing over 450 people, Shiels is a leading online retailer with stores in South Australia, Queensland, New South Wales and Western Australia.

During his travels, particularly Montreal and Toronto, Canada, Albert noticed the success of suburban malls. Hypothesising that this would likely become a trend in Australia at some point, Albert would open up his first suburban Shiels store at Westfield Marion. Located at Oaklands Park in Adelaide's south, the centre was the Westfield Group’s first suburban shopping mall in South Australia. He followed wherever Westfield went until he had approximately 10 stores in Australia.

Albert decided to keep the name “Shiels” to nurture the trust that already existed between the consumer and the business. He then led Shiels into being the first company to introduce “genuine discounting” in the Australian jewellery industry with his notorious advertising slogan, “No Hoo-Haa”. Albert was also reportedly the “first jeweller in Australia to sell gold by the gram”.

With prices ranging from $2 to $60,000, Shiels is best known for their commitment to making jewellery more accessible to the masses. They stock an array of well-known jewellery and watch brands including Seiko, Casio, G-Shock, Baby-G, Michael Kors, Guess, Tommy Hilfiger, Disney Couture Kingdom, Skagen, Sekonda, Bulova, Pulsar, Olivia Burton, Daniel Wellington, Fossil, Citizen, Lorus, JAG, Flawless Cut, Memorie, Australian Diamond and Luminsce Lab Grown Diamonds.

The brand launched their online store in 2011, establishing Shiels as a global company with strong relationships with suppliers from around the world, including:

 Italy 
 Switzerland  
 Germany 
 Spain 
 Belgium  
 England 
 United States 
 India 
 Thailand  
 China 
 Japan

Albert's son, Toby Bensimon took over as Shiels' managing director in 2013. Following the work from his parents, Toby is committed to offering expertly crafted jewellery for the best price and an enriching customer service experience.

Under the care and guidance of the Bensimon family, Shiels Jewellers has earned a reputation for consistently making beautiful, unique and long-lasting jewellery pieces. It’s this reputation that enabled the business to expand from just one small store in Adelaide, to all the major shopping centres in metropolitan Adelaide, Perth, Sydney, Brisbane and the Sunshine Coast.

References

External links
No Hoo-Haa Party 2002 election campaign website: Pandora Internet Archive
Shiels Jewellers website
Bill Clinton Talks About Albert and the No Hoo Haa Party

Living people
Businesspeople from Adelaide
Australian Jews
1948 births
Australian jewellers
Australian businesspeople
Australian people of Egyptian-Jewish descent
Australian people of French descent
Australian expatriates in Canada
Egyptian emigrants to Australia
Egyptian Jews
Date of birth missing (living people)